Unseen Skies is a 2021 documentary film directed by Yaara Bou Melhem. The film documents the work of artist Trevor Paglen as he undertakes one of his most ambitious projects, Orbital Reflector, launching an artwork into space to highlight the global impact of technology in the 21st century. The film had its premiere at the San Francisco International Film Festival in April 2021.

Production and distribution 
The film was produced by In Films and is distributed by Participant Media and Magnolia Pictures.

Festivals 
 Sydney Film Festival, 2021
 San Francisco International Film Festival, 2021

Awards and nominations 
 San Francisco International Film Festival, Golden Gate Award (Best Documentary Feature) - nominated

References

External links
 

2021 films
2021 documentary films